Queanbeyan West is a suburb of Queanbeyan, New South Wales, Australia. Queanbeyan West is located west of the central business district (CBD) and also borders the Australian Capital Territory, it is located south of Crestwood and Canberra Avenue and west of Tharwa Road.

References

Queanbeyan